Arianta arbustorum is a medium-sized species of land snail, sometimes known as the "copse snail", a terrestrial pulmonate gastropod mollusk in the family Helicidae.

Subspecies

Several subspecies are recognized by some authors:
 Arianta arbustorum alpicola Férussac, 1821
 Arianta arbustorum arbustorum (Linnaeus, 1758)
 Arianta arbustorum canigonensis (Boubée, 1833)
 Arianta arbustorum picea
 Arianta arbustorum pseudorudis (Schlesch, 1924)
 Arianta arbustorum repellini (Reeve, 1852)
 Arianta arbustorum styriaca (Frauenfeld, 1868)
 Arianta arbustorum vareliensis Ripken & Falkner, 2000

Distribution
This species is native to Europe:
 North-western and central Europe with Alps and Carpathians
 Netherlands
 Austria
 Czech Republic
 Slovakia
 Poland
 Switzerland. One of the most frequent species of land snails in Switzerland, can be very abundant, up to 20 adults per square meter.
 eastern Pyrenees, Spain
 Norway
 Iceland
Faroe Islands
 the British Isles: Great Britain and Ireland In Britain the species suffered slightly from intensive farming and the continuous destructions of suitable uncultivated refuges. It is rare in Ireland.
 Kaliningrad
 Finland. In Finland, it has become so common in the Porvoo region east of Helsinki, that it is locally called the "Porvoo snail".
 Estonia
 Latvia
 scattered to Serbia
 Bulgaria It is rare in Bulgaria.
 western Ukraine

Arianta arbustorum is introduced to North America, but is only known from Canada, where established populations are known from Newfoundland, New Brunswick, Ontario, and Prince Edward Island.

This species has not yet become established in the US, but it is considered to represent a potentially serious threat as a pest, an invasive species which could negatively affect agriculture, natural ecosystems, human health or commerce. Therefore, it has been suggested that this species be given top national quarantine significance in the USA.

Description 

The shell is usually brown with numerous pale yellowish rows of spots and usually with a brown band above the periphery, occasionally yellowish, reddish or with greenish hue, weakly striated and with fine spiral lines on the upper side. The shell has 5-5.5 convex whorls with deep suture. The last whorl is slightly descending near the aperture. The aperture is with prominent white lip inside. The apertural margin is reflected. Umbilicus is entirely covered by the reflected columellar margin.

The width of the shell is 18–25 mm. The height of the shell is 12–22 mm. Dimensions are locally variable.

The shell shape is globular in most present-day populations, but originally is believed to have been depressed in the Pleistocene, before lowlands were invaded and shells became globular, re-invading mountain regions except some isolated spots among glaciers.

The animal is usually black.

Life cycle 
Arianta arbustorum lives in forests and open habitats of any kind. It requires humidity. It lives also in disturbed habitats (not in Ireland where it is restricted to old native woodland). It may locally tolerate non-calcareous substrate, in north Scotland also on sandhills. In the Alps up to 2700 m, in Britain 1200 m, in Bulgaria 1500 m.

It feeds on green herbs, dead animals and faeces.

If snails hatched more than 50 m distant from each other, they are considered isolated since they would not move more than 25 m (neighbourhood area 32–50 m), usually they move about 7–12 m in a year, mostly along water currents.

This species of snail makes and uses calcareous love darts during mating. Reproduction is usually after copulation, but self-fertilization is also possible. The size of the egg is 3.2 mm. Maturity is reached after 2–4 years. The maximum age up to 14 years.

Angiostrongylus vasorum has successfully experimentally infected this snail.

References
This article incorporates public domain text from the reference.

 Kerney, M.P., Cameron, R.A.D. & Jungbluth, J-H. (1983). Die Landschnecken Nord- und Mitteleuropas. Ein Bestimmungsbuch für Biologen und Naturfreunde, 384 pp., 24 plates. [Summer or later]. Hamburg / Berlin (Paul Parey).
 Bank, R. A.; Neubert, E. (2017). Checklist of the land and freshwater Gastropoda of Europe. Last update: July 16th, 2017
 Sysoev, A. V. & Schileyko, A. A. (2009). Land snails and slugs of Russia and adjacent countries. Sofia/Moskva (Pensoft). 312 pp., 142 plates.

External links

Arianta arbustorum at Animalbase taxonomy,short description, distribution, biology,status (threats), images 
 Arianta arbustorum  images at Encyclopedia of Life
 Linnaeus, C. (1758). Systema Naturae per regna tria naturae, secundum classes, ordines, genera, species, cum characteribus, differentiis, synonymis, locis. Editio decima, reformata [10th revised edition, vol. 1: 824 pp. Laurentius Salvius: Holmiae]
 Pennant, T. (1777). British Zoology, vol. IV. Crustacea. Mollusca. Testacea. London. i-viii, 1-154, Plates 1-93

Studies 
 Baur, Anette; Baur, Bruno (2005) Interpopulation variation in the prevalence and intensity of parasitic mite infection in the land snail Arianta arbustorum ; Invertebrate Biology, Vol. 124 Issue 3, p194-201. 8p. 3 Charts. DOI: 10.1111/j.1744-7410.2005.00019.x.
 Baur, Bruno & Locher Rolf (1998) Sperm allocation in the simultaneously hermaphroditic land snail Arianta arbustorum. Animal Behaviour. Oct98, Vol. 56 Issue 4, p839. 7p. 
 Baur, Bruno (1986) Patterns of dispersion, density and dispersal in alpine populations of the land snail Arianta arbustorum (L.) (Helicidae). Holarctic Ecology. Mai 1986, Vol. 9 Issue 2, p117-125. 9p
  Haase Martin, Esch Susanne & Misof Bernhard (2013) Local adaptation, refugial isolation and secondary contact of Alpine populations of the land snail Arianta arbustorum. Journal of Molluscan Studies. Aout 2013, Vol. 79 Issue 3, p241-248. 8p.
 Haase M & Bisenberger A (2003) Allozymic differentiation in the land snail Arianta arbustorum (Stylommatophora, Helicidae): historical inferences  ; Journal of Zoological Systematics & Evolutionary Research. Aout 2003, Vol. 41 Issue 3, p175-185. 11p. DOI: 10.1046/j.1439-0469.2003.00208.x. 
 Kleeweint Doris (1999), Population size, density, spatial distribution and dispersal in an Austrian population of the land snail Arianta arbustorum styriaca (Gastropoda: Helicidae) ; Journal of Molluscan Studies. Aout 1999, Vol. 65 Issue 3, p303-315. 13p. 3
 Haase M & Misof B (2009), Dynamic gastropods: stable shell polymorphism despite gene flow in the land snail Arianta arbustorum. Dynamische Schnecken: stabiler Schalenpolymorphismus trotz Genflusses in der Landschnecke Arianta arbustorum. Journal of Zoological Systematics & Evolutionary Research. Mai 2009, Vol. 47 Issue 2, p105-114. 10p. DOI: 10.1111/j.1439-0469.2008.00488.x
 Minoretti, Nicole; Stoll, Peter; Baur, Bruno (2013) Heritability of sperm length and adult shell size in the land snail Arianta arbustorum (Linnaeus, 1758) Journal of Molluscan Studies. Aout 2013, Vol. 79 Issue 3, p218-224. 7p. 
 Schüpbach, Hans U.; Baur, Bruno (2008), Parasitic mites influence fitness components of their host, the land snail Arianta arbustorum.. Invertebrate Biology, Vol. 127 Issue 3, p350-356. 7p. 1 Chart, 2 Graphs. DOI: 10.1111/j.1744-7410.2008.00138.x.

Helicidae
Molluscs of Europe
Gastropods described in 1758
Taxa named by Carl Linnaeus